Suzhi may refer to:

 Suzhi (crater), impact crater on Mars
 Suzhi (苏志墓地), Bronze Age necropolis of the Kayue culture in present-day Qinghai, China